Aach is a German-language toponym and frequent element in place names and may refer to:

 Aach (toponymy)

Rivers and streams 
Ach (Blau), also known as Aach, tributary of the Blau River, Germany
 Aach, tributary of the Rietaach, near Altstätten, Switzerland
Memminger Aach, tributary of the Danube, Bavaria, Germany
 Tributaries of the Rhine which flow into Lake Constance: 
Aach (Arbon), near Arbon, Arbon district, Switzerland
Aach, near Romanshorn, Arbon district, Switzerland
Radolfzeller Aach, near Radolfzell, Baden-Württemberg, Germany
Seefelder Aach, also called Linzer Aach, Unteruhldingen, Germany
Deggenhauser Aach, left tributary near Salem, Baden-Württemberg, Germany
Stockacher Aach, near Bodman, Baden-Württemberg, Germany
Mahlspürer Aach, left tributary near Stockach, Baden-Württemberg, Germany
Zwiefalter Aach, tributary of the Danube near Zwiefaltendorf, Baden-Württemberg, Germany

Localities 
 Aach, Baden-Württemberg, Germany
 Aach, a district of Dornstetten, Baden-Württemberg, Germany
 Aach, Rhineland-Palatinate, Germany
 Aach, a town in the community of Braunau, Switzerland
 Aach, a town in the municipality of Tübach, Switzerland
 Aach im Allgäu, a district of Oberstaufen, Bavaria, Germany
 Aach-Linz, a district of Pfullendorf, Baden-Württemberg, Germany

People 
 Aach (surname), a German surname derived from the toponym

See also
 ACH (disambiguation), including Ach
 Ache (disambiguation)
 Aachen, North Rhine-Westphalia, Germany